This is a list of former titles of Departments of State in Ireland. The Ministers and Secretaries Act 1924 established eleven Departments of State. The titles of two of these were amended by an Act in 1928, and an Act in 1939 allowed further changes to the titles and responsibilities of Departments to be made by order of the government. The titles and responsibilities of departments are often changed by the government. In many instances, the legal successor of a department is not one which currently holds responsibilities for some or any of the same areas. Further departments were established by later amendments to the Ministers and Secretaries Act. The process of renaming of departments and transfer of responsibilities are detailed on the page for each department.

The titles of the Departments of Finance, Defence, Rural and Community Development, and Further and Higher Education, Research, Innovation and Science have not changed since their establishment.

References
Alphabetical list of orders made under section 6 (1) of the Ministers and Secretaries (Amendment) Act 1939 (change of name and transfer of functions between Departments of State)

 
Politics of the Republic of Ireland